UPDATE: Applications of Research in Music Education is a biannual peer-reviewed academic journal that covers the field of music education. The editor-in-chief is Debbie Rohwer. It was established in 1982 by Dr. Charles Elliot and is published by SAGE Publications in association with the National Association for Music Education.

Abstracting and indexing 
The journal is abstracted and indexed in:
 Academic Search Premier
 Educator's Reference Complete
 ERIC - Education Resources Information Center
 MLA International Bibliography
 The Music Index
 Wilson Education Index

External links 
 

SAGE Publishing academic journals
English-language journals
Music education journals
Publications established in 1989
Biannual journals